A Village Afraid is a 1950 detective novel by the British writer Cecil Street, writing under the pen name of Miles Burton. It was part of a lengthy series of books featuring the detective Desmond Merrion and Inspector Arnold of Scotland Yard.

Synopsis
Five prominent members of the little village of Micheigreen gather for drinks coaching inn The Swan after a meeting of the Parish Council. The next day one of their number, wealthy businessman Norman Rother is found dead. While initial suspicion points at his dissatisfied younger wife  Annette, the local police are flummoxed can call in the expertise of Merrion and Arnold.

References

Bibliography
 Evans, Curtis. Masters of the "Humdrum" Mystery: Cecil John Charles Street, Freeman Wills Crofts, Alfred Walter Stewart and the British Detective Novel, 1920-1961. McFarland, 2014.
 Herbert, Rosemary. Whodunit?: A Who's Who in Crime & Mystery Writing. Oxford University Press, 2003.
 Hubin, Allen J. Crime Fiction, 1749-1980: A Comprehensive Bibliography. Garland Publishing, 1984.
 Reilly, John M. Twentieth Century Crime & Mystery Writers. Springer, 2015.

1950 British novels
Novels by Cecil Street
British mystery novels
British detective novels
Collins Crime Club books
Novels set in England